Paranoid personality disorder (PPD) is a mental illness characterized by paranoid delusions, and a pervasive, long-standing suspiciousness and generalized mistrust of others. People with this personality disorder may be hypersensitive, easily insulted, and habitually relate to the world by vigilant scanning of the environment for clues or suggestions that may validate their fears or biases. They are eager observers and they often think they are in danger and look for signs and threats of that danger, potentially not appreciating other interpretations or evidence.

They tend to be guarded and suspicious and have quite constricted emotional lives. Their reduced capacity for meaningful emotional involvement and the general pattern of isolated withdrawal often lend a quality of schizoid isolation to their life experience. People with PPD may have a tendency to bear grudges, suspiciousness, tendency to interpret others' actions as hostile, persistent tendency to self-reference, or a tenacious sense of personal right. Patients with this disorder can also have significant comorbidity with other personality disorders, such as schizotypal, schizoid, narcissistic, avoidant, and borderline.

Causes
A genetic contribution to paranoid traits and a possible genetic link between this personality disorder and schizophrenia exist. A large long-term Norwegian twin study found paranoid personality disorder to be modestly heritable and to share a portion of its genetic and environmental risk factors with the other cluster A personality disorders, schizoid and schizotypal.

Psychosocial theories implicate projection of negative internal feelings and parental modeling. Cognitive theorists believe the disorder to be a result of an underlying belief that other people are unfriendly in combination with a lack of self-awareness.

Diagnosis

ICD-10 
The World Health Organization's ICD-10 lists paranoid personality disorder under. It is a requirement of ICD-10 that a diagnosis of any specific personality disorder also satisfies a set of general personality disorder criteria. It is also pointed out that for different cultures it may be necessary to develop specific sets of criteria with regard to social norms, rules and other obligations.

PPD is characterized by at least three of the following symptoms:
 excessive sensitivity to setbacks and rebuffs;
 tendency to bear grudges persistently (i.e. refusal to forgive insults and injuries or slights);
 suspiciousness and a pervasive tendency to distort experience by misconstruing the neutral or friendly actions of others as hostile or contemptuous;
 a combative and tenacious sense of self-righteousness out of keeping with the actual situation;
 recurrent suspicions, without justification, regarding sexual fidelity of spouse or sexual partner;
 tendency to experience excessive self-aggrandizing, manifest in a persistent self-referential attitude;
 preoccupation with unsubstantiated "conspiratorial" explanations of events both immediate to the patient and in the world at large.
Includes: expansive paranoid, fanatic, querulant and sensitive paranoid personality disorder.

Excludes: delusional disorder and schizophrenia.

DSM-5
The American Psychiatric Association's DSM-5 has similar criteria for paranoid personality disorder. They require in general the presence of lasting distrust and suspicion of others, interpreting their motives as malevolent, from an early adult age, occurring in a range of situations. Four of seven specific issues must be present, which include different types of suspicions or doubt (such as of being exploited, or that remarks have a subtle threatening meaning), in some cases regarding others in general or specifically friends or partners, and in some cases referring to a response of holding grudges or reacting angrily.

PPD is characterized by a pervasive distrust and suspiciousness of others such that their motives are interpreted as malevolent, beginning by early adulthood and present in a variety of contexts. To qualify for a diagnosis, the patient must meet at least four out of the following criteria:
 Suspects, without sufficient basis, that others are exploiting, harming, or deceiving them.
 Is preoccupied with unjustified doubts about the loyalty or trustworthiness of friends or associates.
 Is reluctant to confide in others because of unwarranted fear that the information will be used maliciously against them.
 Reads hidden demeaning or threatening meanings into benign remarks or events.
 Persistently bears grudges (i.e., is unforgiving of insults, injuries, or slights).
 Perceives attacks on their character or reputation that are not apparent to others and is quick to react angrily or to counterattack.
 Has recurrent suspicions, without justification, regarding fidelity of spouse or sexual partner.
The DSM-5 lists paranoid personality disorder essentially unchanged from the DSM-IV-TR version and lists associated features that describe it in a more quotidian way. These features include suspiciousness, intimacy avoidance, hostility and unusual beliefs/experiences.

Other
Various researchers and clinicians may propose varieties and subsets or dimensions of personality related to the official diagnoses. Psychologist Theodore Millon has proposed five subtypes of paranoid personality:

Differential diagnosis
Paranoid personality disorder can involve, in response to stress, very brief psychotic episodes (lasting minutes to hours). The paranoid may also be at greater than average risk of experiencing major depressive disorder, agoraphobia, social anxiety disorder, obsessive-compulsive disorder and substance-related disorders. Criteria for other personality disorder diagnoses are commonly also met, such as: schizoid, schizotypal, narcissistic, avoidant, borderline and negativistic personality disorder.

Treatment
Because of reduced levels of trust, there can be challenges in treating PPD. However, psychotherapy, antidepressants, antipsychotics and anxiolytic medications can play a role when a person is receptive to intervention.

Epidemiology
PPD occurs in about 0.5–4.4% of the general population. It is seen in 2–10% of psychiatric outpatients. In clinical samples men have higher rates, whereas epidemiologically there is a reported higher rate of women.

History

Paranoid personality disorder is listed in DSM-V and was included in all previous versions of the DSM. One of the earliest descriptions of the paranoid personality comes from the French psychiatrist Valentin Magnan who described a "fragile personality" that showed idiosyncratic thinking, hypochondriasis, undue sensitivity, referential thinking, and suspiciousness.

Closely related to this description is Emil Kraepelin's description from 1905 of a pseudo-querulous personality who is "always on the alert to find grievance, but without delusions", vain, self-absorbed, sensitive, irritable, litigious, obstinate, and living at strife with the world. In 1921, he renamed the condition paranoid personality and described these people as distrustful, feeling unjustly treated and feeling subjected to hostility, interference and oppression. He also observed a contradiction in these personalities: on the one hand, they stubbornly hold on to their unusual ideas, on the other hand, they often accept every piece of gossip as the truth. Kraepelin also noted that paranoid personalities were often present in people who later developed paranoid psychosis. Subsequent writers also considered traits like suspiciousness and hostility to predispose people to developing delusional illnesses, particularly "late paraphrenias" of old age.

Following Kraepelin, Eugen Bleuler described "contentious psychopathy" or "paranoid constitution" as displaying the characteristic triad of suspiciousness, grandiosity, and feelings of persecution. He also emphasized that these people's false assumptions do not attain the form of real delusion.

Ernst Kretschmer emphasized the sensitive inner core of the paranoia-prone personality: they feel shy and inadequate but at the same time they have an attitude of entitlement. They attribute their failures to the machinations of others but secretly to their own inadequacy. They experience constant tension between feelings of self-importance and experiencing the environment as unappreciative and humiliating.

Karl Jaspers, a German phenomenologist, described "self-insecure" personalities who resemble the paranoid personality. According to Jaspers, such people experience inner humiliation, brought about by outside experiences and their interpretations of them. They have an urge to get external confirmation to their self-deprecation and that makes them see insults in the behavior of other people. They suffer from every slight because they seek the real reason for them in themselves. This kind of insecurity leads to overcompensation: compulsive formality, strict social observances, and exaggerated displays of assurance.

In 1950, Kurt Schneider described the "fanatic psychopaths" and divided them into two categories: the combative type that is very insistent about his false notions and actively quarrelsome, and the eccentric type that is passive, secretive, vulnerable to esoteric sects, but nonetheless suspicious about others.

The descriptions of Leonhard and Sheperd from the sixties describe paranoid people as overvaluing their abilities and attributing their failure to the ill-will of others; they also mention that their interpersonal relations are disturbed and they are in constant conflict with others.

In 1975, Polatin described the paranoid personality as rigid, suspicious, watchful, self-centered and selfish, inwardly hypersensitive, but emotionally undemonstrative. However, when there is a difference of opinion, the underlying mistrust, authoritarianism, and rage burst through.

In the 1980s, paranoid personality disorder received little attention, and when it did receive it, the focus was on its 
potential relationship to paranoid schizophrenia. The most significant contribution of this decade comes from Theodore Millon who divided the features of paranoid personality disorder to four categories:

1) Behavioral characteristics of vigilance, abrasive irritability, and counterattack

2) Complaints indicating oversensitivity, social isolation, and mistrust

3) The dynamics of denying personal insecurities, attributing these to others, and self-inflation through grandiose fantasies

4) Coping style of detesting dependence and hostile distancing of oneself from others

Controversy 
Due to repeated concerns of the validity of PPD and poor empirical evidence, it has been suggested that PPD be removed from the DSM. This is also believed to contribute to low research output on PPD.

See also

References

External links 

 National Personality Disorder website for England
 Articles about Personality Disorders in Web4health web site

Cluster A personality disorders
Paranoia